NUG may refer to any of a number of entities:

National Unity Government
 Nug (graffiti artist)

Acronym
 National Unity Government of Myanmar, a parallel government created in the aftermath of the 2021 Myanmar coup d'état by supporters of ousted Aung San Suu Kyi.
 Guidelines for National Unification between mainland China and Taiwan
 Necrotizing ulcerative gingivitis, a subclassification of the Necrotizing periodontal diseases